Iceland competed at the 1972 Summer Olympics in Munich, West Germany.

Results by event

Athletics

Men
Track & road events

Field events

Women
Field events

Handball

Summary
Key:
 ET – After extra time
 P – Match decided by penalty-shootout.

 Axel Axelsson
 Ólafur Benediktsson
 Björgvin Björgvinsson
 Hjalti Einarsson
 Sigurður Einarsson
 Birgir Finnbogason
 Stefán Gunnarsson
 Geir Hallsteinsson
 Ólafur Jónsson
 Stefán Jónsson
 Jón Magnússon
 Ágúst Ögmundsson
 Sigurbergur Sigsteinsson
 Viðar Símonarson
 Gunnsteinn Skúlason

Swimming

Men

Weightlifting

Men

Nations at the 1972 Summer Olympics
1972 Summer Olympics
Summer Olympics